Shadow Maker: Gwendolyn MacEwen, Poet is a Canadian short documentary film, directed by Brenda Longfellow and released in 1998. Based in part on Rosemary Sullivan's 1995 biography Shadow Maker: The Life of Gwendolyn MacEwen, the film is a portrait of the life and work of Canadian poet Gwendolyn MacEwen.

The film had its theatrical premiere on February 24, 1998, at the John Spotton Theatre in Toronto, before being broadcast on March 4 as an episode of TVOntario's documentary series The View from Here. 

The film won the Genie Award for Best Short Documentary at the 19th Genie Awards in 1999.

References

External links

1998 films
1998 documentary films
Canadian short documentary films
English-language Canadian films
1990s Canadian films
Documentary films about poets
Best Short Documentary Film Genie and Canadian Screen Award winners
Documentary films about women writers